Gnaeus Domitius Ahenobarbus (d. ca. 104 BC) was a Roman general and senator who served as consul in 122 BC. He led a campaign to conquer southern Gaul against the Allobroges together with his successor Quintus Fabius Maximus Allobrogicus. Domitius was active in the early development of southern Roman Gaul, establishing the first Roman colony at Colonia Narbon Martius, and sponsored projects such as the Via Domitia connecting Italy to Spain through southern Gaul. He was probably also the sponsor of the Altar of Domitius Ahenobarbus in the Temple of Neptune in Rome. Ahenobarbus was censor in 115 BC and became pontifex at an unknown date before dying .

Background and family
He was a member of the prestigious Domitii Ahenobarbi, a plebeian family. His father was Gnaeus Domitius Ahenobarbus, who served as consul suffect in 162 BC. His grandfather Gnaeus Domitius Ahenobarbus was consul in 192 BC.

He was survived by two sons, Gnaeus Domitius Ahenobarbus (consul in 96 BC) and Lucius Domitius Ahenobarbus (consul in 94 BC). He was the grandfather of Lucius Domitius Ahenobarbus (consul in 54 BC). It is from this line Domitius is an ancestor of the last Julio-Claudian emperor Nero (AD 54 - 68), born Lucius Domitius Ahenobarbus.

Career

The following year, 122 BC, begins the consulship of Domitius in which he led the campaign against the Allobroges. The Allobroges did harm to the pro-Roman Aedui tribe and harbored a leader of the Salluvii, King Teutomalius, who escaped the destruction of his city and enslavement by the Romans from the previous year. Along his way to the Allobroges, Domitius met with an ambassador of King Bituitus of the powerful Arverni. The discussions did not go in Rome's favor, however, and the Arverni joined the Allobroges against Rome in 121 BC.

Domitius was no longer consul, but led his army anyway as proconsul. At the conflux of the Rhône and Sulga he defeated the Allobroges at the Battle of Vindalium. At the same time, consul Quintus Fabius Maximus Allobrogicus led another force to the north near modern Valence at the convergence of the Rhône and Isère rivers where they achieved a resounding victory over a significantly larger force of Celts, suffering minimal casualties. Rome's victory was complete enough; there wouldn't be another campaign in the area for two decades afterward.

Domitius took Bituitus and sent him off to a prison in Rome out of jealousy of Fabius as to prevent the slain enemy commander from being paraded in Rome for Fabius' triumph. For his victory at Vindalium he was awarded a triumph and the title imperator, as is Maximus for the victory at Isère. There are two facts about the Senate's reaction to their victories that stands out. Firstly, Fabius was awarded a triumphal  "Allobrogicus" for his victory, whereas Domitius was not. Secondly, Fabius conducted his triumphal procession first. This is unusual considering Domitius was the senior of the two and would normally go first in such a procession. The triumph in 120 BC marks the end of his three-year command over Transalpine Gaul.

Having completed the conquests of what is now in western Languedoc, Domitius established the first Roman colony in Gaul called Colonia Narbo Martius (Narbonne) in 118 BC. It is also around this time he constructed the Via Domitia, a road connecting Italy to Rome provinces in Spain. The road is named after himself. It was built along an ancient trading road, crossing the Alps by one of the easiest passages, the Col de Montgenèvre.

As censor in 115 BC, he expelled thirty-two senators from the senate.

Domitius was made pontifex at an uncertain date and later died around 104 BC.

References

Bibliography

Primary sources
 Cicero, Pro Cluentio
 Cicero, Pro Fonteio
 Livy, Ab Urbe Condita Libri
 Suetonius, De vita Caesarum

Secondary sources
 
 
 
 
 
 

2nd-century BC births
Year of birth unknown
104 BC deaths
2nd-century BC Roman consuls
Senators of the Roman Republic
Roman censors
Ancient Roman generals
Gnaeus